This is a list of well-known real birds. For famous fictional birds, see list of fictional birds.

 Águia Vitória, a bald eagle who serves as the mascot for Portuguese football club S.L. Benfica
 Albert Ross, an albatross believed to have been observed between 1967 and 1995
 Alex, a grey parrot who, in studies by Dr. Irene Pepperberg, demonstrated an ability to count; differentiate categories involving objects, colors, shapes, and materials; and understand the concept of same and different
 All Alone, a Second World War homing pigeon awarded the Dickin Medal, the animal equivalent of the Victoria Cross
 Andy, a goose born without feet who used sneakers to help him stand and walk. He was killed by an unnamed perpetrator in 1991.
 B95, a red knot known for being the oldest known member of his species
 Barry, a barred owl who lived in Central Park in New York City
 Beach Comber, a Second World War homing pigeon awarded the Dickin Medal
 Billy, a Second World War homing pigeon awarded the Dickin Medal
 Broad Arrow, a Second World War homing pigeon awarded the Dickin Medal
 Bubi, a Eurasian eagle-owl that lives near the Helsinki Olympic Stadium. His appearance at football games is considered a good omen for the Finland national football team, which has taken the nickname of "Huuhkajat," the Finnish word for the species. Bubi was named Helsinki's "Resident of the Year" in 2007.
Canuck, a northwestern crow who was voted Metro Vancouver's unofficial ambassador
 Challenger, the first bald eagle in history trained to free fly into major sporting events during the American national anthem
 Charlie, a blue-and-yellow macaw whose owner claimed she belonged to Winston Churchill and had been taught to shout curses at Nazis
 Cher Ami, British-bred homing pigeon who, in the autumn of 1918, delivered 12 messages for the U.S. Army during World War I, among other things helping to save the Lost Battalion
 Cologne, a Second World War homing pigeon awarded the Dickin Medal
 Commando, a Second World War homing pigeon awarded the Dickin Medal, who carried out more than ninety missions carrying intelligence for the British
 Cookie, a Major Mitchell's cockatoo who at the time of his death at the age of 83, was recognized by Guinness World Records as the oldest living parrot in the world
 Cosmo, a grey parrot known for knowing over 200 words and being the subject of a book, Conversations with Cosmo 
 DD.43.Q.879, a Second World War homing pigeon awarded the Dickin Medal
 DD.43.T.139, a Second World War homing pigeon awarded the Dickin Medal
 Dick the Mockingbird, a mockingbird belonging to Thomas Jefferson and believed to be the first presidential pet to live in the White House
 Domino Day 2005 sparrow, a house sparrow who was shot and killed after disturbing preparations for Domino Day 2005
 Douglas, a scarlet macaw who played the parrot Rosalinda in the 1970 film Pippi in the South Seas
 Duke of Normandy, a Second World War homing pigeon awarded the Dickin Medal
 Dutch Coast, a Second World War homing pigeon awarded the Dickin Medal
 Flaco, a Eurasian eagle-owl which escaped from the Central Park Zoo after its enclosure was vandalized in February 2023.
 Flying Dutchman, a Second World War homing pigeon awarded the Dickin Medal
 Gertie the Duck, a mallard duck who nested on some pilings under a bridge in Milwaukee in 1945 She (and her brood) are immortalized in RiverSculpture!
 G.I. Joe, a Second World War homing pigeon awarded the Dickin Medal, a member of the United States Army Pigeon Service. On 18 October 1943, the village of Calvi Vecchia, Italy was scheduled to be bombed by the Allies. He carried the message that British forces had captured the village, thus averting the attack and saving the lives of over a thousand people, both the local Italians and the British occupying troops.
 Goldie, a golden eagle who lived at the London Zoo in the 1960s and caused a sensation when he briefly escaped in 1965
 Grape-kun, a Humboldt penguin living at the Tobu Zoo who became famous for his attachment to a cutout of an anime character
 Greater, a greater flamingo, the oldest flamingo on record, who died in 2014 at the Adelaide Zoo, aged at least 83
 Grecia, the first toucan to receive a prosthetic beak
 Grip, a raven kept as a pet by Charles Dickens
 Gustav, a Second World War homing pigeon awarded the Dickin Medal
 Incas, the last Carolina parakeet, who died in 1918 at the Cincinnati Zoo, reportedly of grief after his mate Lady Jane died a few months before him, in 1917
 Jimmy the raven, who appeared in more than 1,000 feature films from the 1930s through the 1950s, including It's a Wonderful Life and The Wizard of Oz
 Joe, a pigeon found in Australia believed to have flown there from Oregon. He was originally at risk of being euthanized, but was ultimately pardoned after it was found he likely came from Australia and did not pose a biosecurity risk.
 John Silver, a First World War homing pigeon known for receiving an eye patch and a wooden leg
 Kenley Lass, a Second World War homing pigeon awarded the Dickin Medal
 The King of Rome, a successful racing pigeon who set a long-distance pigeon racing record in England
 Klepetan and Malena, a pair of white storks renowned for their romantic endeavors
 Lady Baltimore, a bald eagle living at the Juneau Raptor Center
 Leaping Lena, a West German racing pigeon who became lost in Czechoslovakia during a routine flight in 1954 and returned bearing a note on her leg with an anti-communist message
 Long Boi, an Indian Runner-mallard duck cross and unofficial mascot of the University of York who became famous due to his height (70 cm tall)
 Louis, a parrot known for preventing development of his owner's estate from 1949 to 1966
 Mandarin Patinkin (also known as Hot Duck), a mandarin duck which appeared in New York City's Central Park in 2018.
 Mani, a rose-ringed parakeet living in Singapore, who became famous in 2010 after correctly predicting the winners for all of the 2010 FIFA World Cup quarter-final ties
 Manukura, the first white kiwi born in captivity
 Maquis, a Second World War homing pigeon awarded the Dickin Medal
 Mario, a Toulouse goose, formerly living in Echo Park, Los Angeles, who became the subject of news reports in 2011 after forming an unusual association with a local resident
 Martha, the last of the American passenger pigeons, who died at the Cincinnati Zoo in 1914. Species Requiem Day, September 1, marks Martha's passing.
 Mary of Exeter, a Second World War homing pigeon awarded the Dickin Medal
 Matilda, the world's oldest known chicken
 Mercury, a Second World War homing pigeon awarded the Dickin Medal
 Mike the Headless Chicken, a Wyandotte rooster of Fruita, Colorado, who lived for 18 months after his head was cut off. The botched decapitation in 1945 missed his brain stem and jugular vein. His owners fed him thereafter with an eyedropper, and took him on tours of the West Coast. He died in 1947.
 Mozart's starling, a common starling kept as a pet by Wolfgang Amadeus Mozart
 Navy Blue, a Second World War homing pigeon awarded the Dickin Medal
 Nils Olav, a king penguin, mascot and colonel-in-chief of the Norwegian King's Guard
 N'kisi, a grey parrot known for her supposed advanced use of the English language
 NPS.42.NS.2780, a Second World War homing pigeon awarded the Dickin Medal
 NPS.42.NS.7524, a Second World War homing pigeon awarded the Dickin Medal
 NURP.38.BPC.6, a Second World War homing pigeon awarded the Dickin Medal
 NURP.43.CC.1418, a Second World War homing pigeon awarded the Dickin Medal
 Old Abe, an American Civil War bald eagle who was the mascot of a Wisconsin regiment, whose image was adopted in Case Corporation's logo and as the screaming eagle on the insignia of the U.S. Army's 101st Airborne Division
 Omid, the only Siberian crane that continues to return to Iran
 Paddy, a Second World War homing pigeon awarded the Dickin Medal
 Pag-asa, the first Philippine eagle to be bred and hatched in captivity 
 Pale Male, a red-tailed hawk living near Central Park in New York City
 Mr Percival, an Australian pelican and notable film actor
 Peter, a bald eagle who lived at the Philadelphia Mint during the 1830s
 Petra, a black swan who appeared to fall in love with a pedalo resembling a swan
 Petros, a pelican who became a mascot of the Greek island of Mykonos
 Pierre, an African penguin who became the first penguin to have bald spots restored
 Pink Floyd, the name given to two separate flamingos who escaped from captivity in the United States and lived in the wild for many years
 Princess, a Second World War homing pigeon awarded the Dickin Medal
 Ravachol Parrot, a parrot who lived in Pontevedra, Spain, from 1891 and 1913 and became a symbol of the city
 Royal Blue, a Second World War homing pigeon awarded the Dickin Medal
 Roy and Silo, a same-sex pair of chinstrap penguins who lived at the Central Park Zoo
 Rufus, a Harris's hawk used by the All England Lawn Tennis and Croquet Club to keep pigeons away from their venue
 Ruhr Express, a Second World War homing pigeon awarded the Dickin Medal
 Mr Rutland, an osprey introduced to England after the species went extinct there in the 1840s
 Scotch Lass, a Second World War homing pigeon awarded the Dickin Medal
 Sirocco, a hand-reared kākāpō who became an ambassador for his species and conservation in New Zealand
 Herbie, a duck who became known in the 1970s after a clip of him skateboarding was shown on BBC news program Nationwide
Snowball, a male Eleonora cockatoo, noted as being the first non-human animal conclusively demonstrated to be capable of beat induction
 Sparkie Williams, a talking budgerigar who provided the inspiration for an opera by Michael Nyman and Carsten Nicolai
 Tommy, a Second World War homing pigeon awarded the Dickin Medal
 Tyke, a Second World War homing pigeon awarded the Dickin Medal
 Ulysses, Gerald Durrell's pet owl when he was growing up in Corfu. Ulysses appeared frequently in Durrell's books about living on the Greek island, such as his 1956 book My Family and Other Animals.
 Victoria, the first goose to receive a prosthetic beak
 Whipper, a budgerigar known for its unusual appearance, caused by a genetic mutation 
 White Vision, a Second World War homing pigeon awarded the Dickin Medal
 William of Orange, a Second World War homing pigeon awarded the Dickin Medal
 Winkie, a Second World War homing pigeon awarded the Dickin Medal
 Wisdom, a wild female Laysan albatross. She is the oldest confirmed wild bird in the world as well as the oldest banded bird in the world.
 Yaren, a stork known for its friendship with a fisherman living in Eskikaraağaç village of Bursa, Turkey
 Zelda, a wild turkey who lived at the Battery in New York City from 2003 to 2014
 Zenobia, one of the last northern bald ibises in Syria

See also
 The Capitoline geese, who warned of an imminent attack on Rome by the Gauls in 390 BC.
 The cliff swallows, that return from Villa Ventana, Argentina every year to the Mission San Juan Capistrano in California about March 19
 The Peabody Ducks of Memphis, Tennessee, which, in a tradition dating back to the 1930s, are escorted from their penthouse palace down the elevator every day of the year at 11:00 a.m., cross a red carpet to a Sousa march, and spend the day in the lobby fountain, returning home with equal ceremony at 5:00 p.m.
 The gulls, who saved the Mormon pioneers from a cricket infestation
 The gulls living at Japan's Kabushima Shrine, a place of worship, natural monument and popular tourist attraction
 The Hollywood Freeway chickens, a feral colony living under the Vineland Avenue off-ramp of the Hollywood Freeway in Los Angeles
 The ravens of the Tower of London, whose continuing presence there is said to maintain the general safety of the kingdom
 The feral peacocks of Memorial, Houston, in the Nottingham Forest subdivision
 The Peace Bridge robins, a family of American robins that nested for several years on Peace Bridge in the 1930s

References

 Individual
Birds
Bird